Question is the second extended play by South Korean girl group CLC. It was released on May 28, 2015. "Like" was released as the lead single.

This is the last EP before additional of the new members, Elkie and Eunbin prior to the release of Refresh.

Background
Rookie girl group CLC, made their first comeback with the release of their second mini-album Question. The album and music video for their promotional single "Curious (Like)" was released on May 28. The track is composed by songwriters Seo Jaewoo, Big Sancho and Son Youngjin, and is centered around the young hearts of a one-sided love.

Track listing

Charts

Release history

References

External links

Cube Entertainment EPs
CLC (group) EPs
2015 EPs
Dance-pop EPs
Korean-language EPs